Strångsjö is a locality situated in Katrineholm Municipality, Södermanland County, Sweden. As of 2010, there are 365 inhabitants.

References 

Populated places in Södermanland County
Populated places in Katrineholm Municipality